Daira Rajput Bhattian, is a small village located in Eminabad Village Near Devan Road, Gujranwala District located in Punjab, Pakistan,.  Village.

References 

Villages in Gujranwala District